The ansa lenticularis (ansa lentiformis in older texts) is a part of the brain, making up the superior layer of the substantia innominata. Its fibers, derived from the medullary lamina of the lentiform nucleus, pass medially to end in the thalamus and subthalamic region, while others are said to end in the tegmentum and red nucleus.
It is classified by NeuroNames as part of the subthalamus.

References

External links
 

Thalamic connections
Basal ganglia connections